Jonathan Nicholas Powell (born 14 August 1956) is a British diplomat who served as the first Downing Street Chief of Staff, under British prime minister Tony Blair from 1997 to 2007. He was the only senior adviser to last the whole period of Blair's leadership. During this period Powell was also the chief British negotiator on Northern Ireland.

In 2007, Powell joined Morgan Stanley as a full-time senior managing director of its investment banking division.

He runs the charity Inter Mediate which works on armed conflicts around the world. In 2014, David Cameron appointed Powell to be the UK's special envoy to Libya.

Early life
Powell is the son of Air Vice-Marshal John Frederick Powell. He has three brothers: Charles, who was foreign policy advisor to former Prime Minister Margaret Thatcher; Chris, a former advertising executive; and Roderick. Although Powell pronounces the family name in the conventional manner (to rhyme with 'towel'), Charles pronounces it as 'pole'.

Powell was educated at the Cathedral Choir School, Canterbury, and the King's School, Canterbury. He read history and gained a 2.1 at University College, Oxford  and the University of Pennsylvania. He then worked for the BBC as a journalist and Granada TV before joining the Foreign Office in 1979.

Diplomatic career
Powell joined the FCO in 1979 and was posted as Third Secretary, later Second Secretary, to Lisbon in 1981. He was subsequently posted to UKDEL CDE Stockholm in 1986 and to UKDEL CSCE Vienna in September 1986. In November 2010, Powell wrote an article for The Guardian that was critical of the publication by WikiLeaks of the contents of US diplomatic cables. Powell argued, "It is very difficult to conduct diplomacy effectively when your confidential deliberations are made public in this way. Mutual trust is the basis of such relations and once that trust is breached, candid conversations are less likely. It is like having a conversation in the pub with your best mate about problems with your girlfriend and then finding the content, possibly with a bit of spin added, posted on the internet. You won't be having that conversation again any time soon."

Powell was desk officer for the negotiations on giving Hong Kong back to the Chinese in 1983–85, and for the Two Plus Four talks on German unification from 1989 to 1990. Powell was posted to the British Embassy in Washington in 1991 and attached himself to Bill Clinton's Presidential campaign as an observer. He later introduced Tony Blair to Bill Clinton and his team after the election.

Downing Street Chief of Staff
Shortly after his election as Leader of the Labour Party, Tony Blair asked Powell to become his chief of staff. Powell initially declined the offer, although he later left the diplomatic service in 1995 to become the Chief of Staff to the Opposition Leader. After Labour's election victory in 1997, Powell was given the new official role of Downing Street Chief of Staff, a new position with the power to issue orders to civil servants, which was unprecedented for a political appointee.

In the early years of the Blair Government, one of Powell's most crucial jobs was his role in the Northern Ireland peace talks that led to the Good Friday Agreement. In March 2008, Powell called for tactics used successfully in Northern Ireland to be applied to the War on Terrorism. He suggested that western governments hold talks with Al Qaeda and the Taliban, just as the British government negotiated with the Provisional IRA in order to bring about a peace deal in Northern Ireland. His suggestion was publicly rejected by the British Foreign Office. His book Great Hatred, Little Room: Making Peace in Northern Ireland details the negotiations which led to the Agreement which devised and put in place a devolved, power-sharing government for Northern Ireland.

Powell continued to be both a key right-hand man for Blair throughout his time in office, as well as a trusted advisor on a wide range of policy issues. He was described by The Guardian as being "at the heart of all his (Blair's) key foreign policy initiatives." It is believed he was questioned twice by police, the second time under caution, during the investigation into the Cash for Honours affair. While many in Blair's "kitchen cabinet" – including Alastair Campbell – departed before Blair's resignation, Powell remained in Downing Street until June 2007.

In February 2012 Peter Oborne, a The Daily Telegraph journalist, criticised Powell for divulging sensitive information about the activities of MI6 in Russia. He told a BBC documentary, Putin, Russia and the West, how MI6 had in 2006 used a "fake rock filled with surveillance devices as a means of communication with their agents in Moscow". Oborne described this as a "propaganda gift for Vladimir Putin", as it soon after featured heavily in a programme screened on prime-time Russian state TV. The footage was used to attack opponents of Putin who at the time, in 2006, had doubted Kremlin reports of MI6's activity in Russia. In the view of Oborne, "Powell’s indiscretion was used to make a full-frontal attack on some of the most respected independent critics of the regime" and Powell had become a "useful idiot" for Putin.

Post Downing Street
Powell was a banker at Morgan Stanley from 2008 to 2009.  In 2011 he founded the charity Inter Mediate with Martin Griffiths to work on armed conflicts around the world. Since 2013 he has also been a member of the Board of Save the Children International.

In May 2014 British prime minister David Cameron appointed Powell as the UK special envoy to Libya to promote dialogue between rival factions in the country.

In March 2017 he was appointed Honorary Professor in the Senator George J. Mitchell Institute for Global Peace, Security and Justice at Queen's University Belfast.

Inquiries
Powell's role as Downing Street Chief of Staff came under close scrutiny during the Hutton Inquiry, held following the death of David Kelly in 2003. Powell gave evidence to the inquiry on 18 August, and described several crucial meetings he had attended at which Kelly had been discussed before his name appeared in the media. An email sent by Powell to the JIC chairman John Scarlett in September 2002 was also highlighted, as it appeared to suggest that a dossier on the threat posed by Iraq should be toughened. Many commentators criticised the style of government described by Powell as too informal, some dubbing it "sofa government", as many meetings were held in relaxed surroundings without proper notes being taken. The subsequent and separate Butler Report also emphasised these criticisms. Both the Hutton and Butler reports indicated Powell was very close to Blair.

On 18 January 2010 Powell gave evidence to the Iraq Inquiry.

Personal life
Powell has four children: two daughters with his partner, Sarah Helm, and two sons from a previous marriage.

Publications
Great Hatred, Little Room: Making Peace in Northern Ireland, The Bodley Head, 2008. .
The New Machiavelli: How to Wield Power in the Modern World, The Bodley Head, 2010. .
Talking to Terrorists: How to End Armed Conflicts, The Bodley Head, 2014, ; published in the United States with the title Terrorists at the Table: Why Negotiating Is the Only Way to Peace, Palgrave Macmillan, 2015, .
The Public Sector: Managing the Unmanageable, Kogan Page, 2013. .  (Contributor).

Radio
 On Machiavellian Politics Jonathan Powell speaks on BBC The Forum

See also
 Tony Blair Associates - Powell worked as a consultant

References

External links
  Profile on BBC site
 'One at a Time', review of Great Hatred, Little Room in the Oxonian Review

1956 births
Alumni of University College, Oxford
Labour Party (UK) officials
Living people
Members of HM Diplomatic Service
People educated at The King's School, Canterbury
BBC people
ITV people
People educated at St Edmund's School Canterbury
Downing Street Chiefs of Staff
20th-century British diplomats